The 544th Intelligence, Surveillance and Reconnaissance Group is a United States Air Force unit assigned to the Air Combat  Command Sixteenth Air Force. It  is stationed at Buckley Space Force Base, Colorado.  It was reactivated under the 70th Intelligence, Surveillance, and Reconnaissance Wing on 26 September, 2022.

A multi-domain intelligence organization, the 544th is a team of approximately 400 Air Force members executing overhead technical signals and infrared intelligence with tradecraft development to achieve mission outcome success in all circumstances.

History
The 544th Intelligence, Surveillance and Reconnaissance Group was initially activated as the 544th Reconnaissance Technical Squadron on 16 November 1950 at Bolling Air Force Base. Initial personnel came from the 4203rd Photographic Technical Squadron. The 544th moved to Offutt Air Force Base, Nebraska in April 1952, although a small unit (Detachment 1) continued operation at Bolling. On 11 July 1958, the unit was redesignated the 544th Reconnaissance Technical Group. The 544th provided photo interpretation during the Cuban Missile Crisis (October 1962) for the National Command Authority.

The next designation was as the 544th Aerospace Reconnaissance Technical Wing when it was redesignated on 1 January 1963. It was assigned directly to Strategic Air Command. In Vietnam, the Boeing RC-135C reconnaissance aircraft, equipped with the ASD-1 reconnaissance system, a number of programmable SIGINT receivers, created much of the 544th Wing's work, an activity known as 'Finder'. In 1979 the 544th was designated as a Major Command Special Activity and on 15 October 1979, was redesignated the 544th Strategic Intelligence Wing. The 544th was redesignated the 544th Intelligence Wing on 1 September 1991, still at Offutt, and then inactivated on 1 June 1992.

On 7 September 1993, Colonel Eric Larson became the commander of the newly reactivated 544th Intelligence Group at Peterson Air Force Base, Colorado, part of Air Force Intelligence Command. Colonel Maurizio Calabrese assumed command of the 544th on 27 June 2018.  In 2000, the 544th received one of its many Air Force Outstanding Unit Award. The award did not extend to the detachments' host commands such as the Naval Security Group Activities Sabana Seca and Sugar Grove. Their support in terms of infrastructure, technical equipment and facilities, allowed the detachments to accomplish their mission.  The group also provided support to Detachment 45 of the Air Force Technical Applications Center. The group was inactivated on 24 July 2020 when it was replaced by Space Delta 7 of the United States Space Force.

On 26 September 2022, the group was reactivated as a part of Air Combat Command with the headquarters relocating to Buckley Space Force Base, Colorado under the command of Colonel Ronald Hopkins. Airmen at the 544th Intelligence, Surveillance and Reconnaissance Group lead the Air Force in executing overhead technical signals intelligence and overhead persistent infrared operations. They partner closely with base agencies to produce integrated intelligence that is critical to the security of the United states. The group is comprised of three squadrons (566th Intelligence Squadron, 18th Intelligence Squadron, 26th Intelligence Squadron), all co-located at Buckley Space Force Base, Colorado, as well as one detachment in Australia.

Lineage, assignments, and stations

Lineage
 Constituted as the 544th Reconnaissance Technical Squadron on 2 November 1950
 Activated on 16 November 1950
 Redesignated 544th Reconnaissance Technical Group on 11 July 1958
 Redesignated 544th Aerospace Reconnaissance Technical Wing on 1 January 1963
 Redesignated 544th Strategic Intelligence Wing on 15 October 1979
 Redesignated 544th Intelligence Wing on 1 September 1991
 Inactivated on 1 June 1992
 Redesignated 544th Intelligence Group on 3 September 1993
 Activated on 7 September 1993
 Redesignated 544th Information Operations Group on 1 August 2000
 Redesignated 544th Intelligence Group on 1 April 2007
 Redesignated 544th Intelligence, Surveillance, and Reconnaissance Group on 1 January 2009
 Inactivated on 24 July 2020
 Activated on 26 September 2022

Assignments
 3902d Air Base Wing, 16 November 1950
 Strategic Air Command, 11 July 1958 – 1 June 1992
 Air Force Intelligence Command (later Air Intelligence Agency), 7 September 1993
 67th Intelligence Wing (later 67th Information Operations Wing), 31 January 2000
 70th Intelligence Wing (later 70th Intelligence, Surveillance, and Reconnaissance Wing), 5 July 2006 – 24 July 2020
 70th Intelligence, Surveillance, and Reconnaissance Wing, 26 September 2022 - Present

Components
 Squadrons 
 18th Intelligence Squadron – Wright-Patterson Air Force Base, Ohio, 7 September 1993 – 24 July 2020
 451st Intelligence Squadron – RAF Menwith Hill, United Kingdom, 1 October 2004 – 31 January 2008
 544th Defensive Intelligence Squadron, by 1978 – 1 June 1992
 544th Intelligence Analysis Squadron, 1 October 1973 – unknown
 544th Intelligence Exploitation Squadron, 1 October 1973 – unknown
 544th Intelligence Support Squadron, by 1978 – 1 June 1992
 544th Offensive Intelligence Squadron, by 1978 – 1 June 1992
 544th Target Materials Squadron, 1 October 1973 – 1 June 1992
 566th Intelligence Squadron – Buckley Space Force Base, Colorado, 2022 – Present
 18th Intelligence Squadron – Buckley Space Force Base, Colorado, 2022 – Present
 26th Intelligence Squadron – Buckley Space Force Base, Colorado, 2022 – Present

 Detachments
 Detachment 1 – Bolling Air Force Base, District of Columbia, 12 April 1952 – unknown
 Detachment 2 – Sabana Seca, Puerto Rico, 1 January 1995 – 21 July 2000
 Detachment 3 – Sugar Grove, West Virginia, 1 January 1995 – unknown
 Detachment 4 – Yakima Research Station, Washington, 1 January 1995 – unknown
 Detachment 5 – Chantilly, Virginia, 5 December 1995 – unknown
 Detachment 7 – Vandenberg Air Force Base, California, unknown – unknown

Stations
 Bolling Air Force Base, District of Columbia, 16 November 1950
 Offutt Air Force Base, Nebraska, 12 April 1952 – 1 June 1992
 Peterson Air Force Base, Colorado, 7 September 1993 – 24 July 2020
 Buckley Space Force Base, Colorado, 26 September 2022 - Present

List of commanders

 Col Jason B. Lamb, July 2016–June 2018
 Col Maurizio Calabrese, June 2018–June 2020
 Col Ronald Hopkins, September 2022-Present

References

Notes
 Explanatory notes

 Citations

Bibliography

External links
 Buckley SFB Official Website

 16th Air Force > Home

544
Military units and formations in Colorado
Military units and formations established in 1950